An ice cream float or ice cream soda, also known as a spider in Australia and New Zealand, is a chilled beverage that consists of ice cream in either a soft drink or a mixture of flavored syrup and carbonated water.

When root beer and vanilla ice cream are used together to make the beverage, it is typically referred to as a root beer float (United States and Canada). A close variation is the coke float, using cola instead of root beer.

History
The ice cream float was invented by Robert McCay Green in Philadelphia, Pennsylvania, in 1874 during the Franklin Institute's semicentennial celebration. The traditional story is that, on a particularly hot day, Green ran out of ice for the flavored drinks he was selling and used vanilla ice cream from a neighboring vendor, inventing a new drink.

His own account, published in Soda Fountain magazine in 1910, states that while operating a soda fountain at the celebration, he wanted to create a new treat to attract customers away from another vendor who had a larger, fancier soda fountain. After some experimentation, he decided to combine ice cream and flavored soda. During the celebration, he sold vanilla ice cream with soda and a choice of 16 flavored syrups. The new treat was a sensation and soon other soda fountains began selling ice cream floats.  Green's will instructed that "Originator of the Ice Cream Soda" was to be engraved on his tombstone.

There are at least three other claimants for the invention of the root beer float: Fred Sanders, Philip Mohr, and George Guy, one of Robert Green's own employees. Guy is said to have absentmindedly mixed ice cream and soda in 1872, much to his customer's delight.

Regional names

In Australia and New Zealand, an ice cream float is known as a "spider" because once the carbonation hits the ice cream it forms a spider web-like reaction. It is traditionally made using either lime or pink cream soda.

In the UK and Ireland, it is usually referred to as an "ice-cream float" or simply a "float", as "coke" is often used generically to refer to any cola in the United Kingdom, and "soda" is usually taken to mean soda water, sweetened carbonated drinks instead being collectively called "soft drinks", "(fizzy) pop" or "fizzy juice".

In Mexico, it is known as "helado flotante" ("floating ice cream") or "flotante". In El Salvador, Honduras, Guatemala, Costa Rica and Colombia it is called vaca negra (black cow), while in Puerto Rico it is referred to as a "black out".

In the United States, an "ice cream soda" typically refers to the drink containing soda water, syrup, and ice cream, whereas a "float" is generally ice cream in a soft drink (usually root beer).

Variations

Variations of ice cream floats are as countless as the varieties of drinks and the flavors of ice cream, but some have become more prominent than others. Some of the most popular are described below:

Chocolate ice cream soda
This ice cream soda starts with approximately 1 oz of chocolate syrup, then several scoops of chocolate ice cream in a tall glass. Unflavored carbonated water is added until the glass is filled and the resulting foam rises above the top of the glass. The final touch is a topping of whipped cream and usually, a maraschino cherry. This variation of ice cream soda was available at local soda fountains and nationally, at Dairy Queen stores for many years.

A similar soda made with chocolate syrup but vanilla ice cream is sometimes called a "black and white" ice cream soda.

Strawberry ice cream soda
This drink is prepared similarly to a chocolate ice cream soda, but with strawberry syrup and strawberry (or vanilla) ice cream used instead.

Root beer float

Also known as a "black cow" or "brown cow", the root beer float is traditionally made with vanilla ice cream and root beer, but it can also be made with other ice cream flavors. Frank J. Wisner, owner of Colorado's Cripple Creek Brewing, is credited with creating the first root beer float on August 19, 1893. The similarly flavored soft drink birch beer may also be used instead of root beer.

In the United States and Canada, the chain A&W Restaurants are well known for their root beer floats. The definition of a black cow varies by region. For instance, in some localities, a "root beer float" has strictly vanilla ice cream; a float made with root beer and chocolate ice cream is a "chocolate cow" or a "brown cow". In some places a "black cow" or a "brown cow" was made with cola instead of root beer. In some areas, for example, Northeastern Wisconsin and Northern Illinois, "black cow" is said to mean a root beer float where a portion of the vanilla ice cream and root beer have been mixed together before filling the glass with scoops of vanilla ice cream and root beer.

In 2008, the Dr Pepper Snapple Group introduced its Float beverage line. This includes A&W Root Beer, A&W Cream Soda and Sunkist flavors which attempt to simulate the taste of their respective ice cream float flavors in a creamy, bottled drink.

Coke float

A coke float can be made with any cola, such as Coca-Cola or Pepsi, and vanilla ice-cream.

Boston cooler

Today, a Boston cooler is typically composed of Vernors ginger ale and vanilla ice cream.

The first reference to a Boston cooler appears in the St. Louis Post Dispatch where a New York bartender claimed to have coined the phrase for a summer cocktail of sarsaparilla and ginger ale. In the 1910s, the term was applied in soda fountains and ice cream parlors to a scoop of ice cream served in a melon half. The name was also applied to a number of different ice-cream float combinations, including root beer, though ginger ale became the most common soft drink component.    

By the 1880s a version of the Boston cooler was being served in Detroit by Sanders Confectionery, made with Sanders' ice cream and Vernors. Originally, a drink called a Vernors Cream was served as a shot or two of sweet cream poured into a glass of Vernors. Later, vanilla ice cream was substituted for the cream and blended like a milkshake. The local myth, that it was named after Detroit's Boston Boulevard, is belied by the fact that Boston Boulevard did not exist at the time.

It remains a popular summer drink in the Detroit area.

Snow White
A Snow White is made with 7 Up or Sprite and vanilla ice cream. The origin of this variation is unknown, but it is found in some Asian eateries.

Purple cow
In the context of ice cream soda, a purple cow is vanilla ice cream in purple grape soda. The Purple Cow, a restaurant chain in the southern United States, features this and similar beverages. In a more general context, a purple cow may refer to a non-carbonated grape juice and vanilla ice cream combination. Grapico, a brand of grape soda bottled in Birmingham, Alabama, is ubiquitously linked to ice cream floats in that state.

Sherbet cooler
The American Friendly's chain had a variation known as a "sherbet cooler," which was a combination of orange or watermelon sherbet, vanilla syrup and seltzer water. (At present, it is billed as a "slammer.")

Vaca-preta
At least in Brazil and Portugal, a non-alcoholic ice cream soda made by combining vanilla or chocolate ice cream and Coca-Cola is known as vaca-preta ("black cow").

Vaca amarela ou vaca dourada
In Brazil, a vaca amarela or yellow cow or vaca dourada or golden cow is an ice cream soda combination of vanilla ice cream and orange or guaraná soda.

Helado flotante
In Mexico the most popular version is made with cola and lemon sorbet.

Orange float
An orange float or orange whip consists of vanilla ice cream and orange soft drinks.

Beer float

A beer float is made of Guinness stout, chocolate ice cream, and espresso. Although the Shakin' Jesse version is blended into more of a milkshake consistency, most restaurant bars can make the beer float version. When making at home, the beer and espresso should be very cold so as to not melt the ice cream.

Nectar soda
This variant is popular in New Orleans and parts of Ohio, made with a syrup consisting of equal parts almond and vanilla syrups mixed with sweetened condensed milk and a touch of red food coloring to produce a pink, opalescent syrup base for the soda.

Melon cream soda 

Cream soda with melon flavor (クリームソーダ) is a common drink in Japan. Melon soda (メロンソーダ) is served with ice and a scoop of vanilla ice cream on top.

See also
 Cream soda—a fully carbonated soft drink based on the flavour of a classic soda
Dirty soda
 Egg cream—a similar beverage made with milk instead of ice cream
 List of brand name soft drink products
 List of soft drink flavors

References

Sources
 Funderburg, Anne Cooper. "Sundae Best: A History of Soda Fountains" (2002) University of Wisconsin Popular Press. .
 Gay, Cheri Y. (2001). Detroit Then and Now, p. 5. Thunder Bay Press. .
 Bulanda, George; Bak, Richard; and Ciavola, Michelle. The Way It Was: Glimpses of Detroit's History from the Pages of Hour Detroit Magazine, p. 8. Momentum Books. .
 Houston, Kay. "Of soda fountains and ice cream parlors." (February 11, 1996) The Detroit News.
 Alissa Ozols (2008) San Francisco.

External links
 
 
 

1874 introductions
American inventions
Food and drink introduced in the 19th century
Soft drinks
Ice cream drinks
American drinks